Karen Sue Haynes (born c. 1946) is an American academic and college administrator who previously served as the president of California State University San Marcos. She also served as president of the University of Houston–Victoria.

Education 
Haynes, a first-generation college student, received her bachelor's in sociology and psychology from Goucher College. She went on to earn a Master of Social Work from McGill University and a doctorate in Social Work from the University of Texas at Austin.  Her 1977 dissertation was titled The Correlates of Mid-Management Satisfaction in a Large Scale Social Service System.

Career 
Although trained as a social worker, Haynes entered academia in the 1990s as a graduate professor at the University of Houston, where she eventually became the first female dean. In 1995, she became the president of the University of Houston–Victoria. In 2004, she was appointed as president of California State University San Marcos. She has said she will retire in June 2019. Her 15-year tenure as president is the longest of any president in the 23-campus California State University (CSU) system. She is also the first woman to serve as president of a CSU campus.

Her term began when the university was just fifteen years old and had 7,000 students and seven buildings. During her tenure the university grew to 17,000 students and 22 buildings, plus a satellite campus in Temecula. More than 100 new academic programs were launched, and the athletic program rose to NCAA Division II status. Haynes made it a focus to attract a diverse student body and to encourage first-generation college students like herself. As of 2018, 45% of the university's students come from traditionally underrepresented demographics, and one-third fall outside the traditional college age range of 18–22.

Selected works

Books

Personal
Haynes is married to Jim Mickelson, who is also a CSUSM administrator, the founder and director of the university's ACE Scholars program serving former foster youth. They live in Vista.

References

Living people
1946 births
Presidents of California State University, San Marcos
McGill University School of Social Work alumni
Goucher College alumni
University of Texas at Austin School of Social Work alumni
Presidents of the University of Houston–Victoria
University of Houston–Victoria faculty
American social workers
20th-century American women writers
21st-century American women writers
Women heads of universities and colleges
American women academics